The 2018 LFA Primeira is the third season of the Liga Futebol Amadora Primeira Divisão. The season began on March 3 and originally finished on August 5, but rescheduled to be finished on July 29.

Karketu Dili is the current defending champions.

Boavista won their first LFA Primeira title, with one match to spare following a 10–1 away win over Cacusan on 22 July 2018, while its competitor Karketu only drew 1–1 against Ponta Leste on 20 July 2018.

Cacusan to be the first team who relegated to 2019 LFA Segunda, with four match to spare following a 0–10 loss against Karketu on 30 June 2018. DIT was the second team got relegated to 2019 LFA Segunda, with two match to spare following a 2–4 loss against Ponta Leste on 13 July 2018.

Teams
There are 8 teams that will play this season.

from Primeira
FC Zebra and FC Porto Taibesse were relegated to 2018 Segunda Divisao after finished 7th and bottom place of 2017 Primeira Divisao.

to Primeira
Atlético Ultramar and DIT F.C. promoted to 2018 Primeira Divisao after securing place as champions and runners-up in 2017 Segunda Divisao. DIT F.C. returned to top flight after last season relegated to Segunda Divisao and Atlético Ultramar was newly promotion clubs.

Name changes
 Carsae FC was renamed to Boavista Futebol Clube Timor Leste in January 2018.

Locations

Personnel and kits

Managerial changes

Stadiums 
 Primary venues used in the 2018 LFA Primera:

Foreign players
Restricting the number of foreign players strictly to four per team. A team could use four foreign players on the field each game. Name on BOLD was foreign players who registered in mid-season transfer window.

League table

Result table

Fixtures and results 
Due to Timor-Leste national under-21 team schedule in April 2018 for their participation in the 2018 Hassanal Bolkiah Trophy, Round 4 and Round 7 was rescheduled from originally on April 21–22 and May 26–27 in Malibaca Yamato Stadium, Maliana and Baucau Municipal Stadium, Baucau move to April 5–8 and June 7–10 in Kampo Demokrasia, Dili, while Round 6 rescheduled from May 17–20 in Kampo Demokrasia, Dili move to May 26–27 in Malibaca Yamato Stadium, Maliana and Baucau Municipal Stadium, Baucau, also Round 5 rescheduled from April 26–29 move to May 17–20 in same place. Rescheduled for Round 8 to Round 14 not yet announced.

On 19 May 2018 Round 6 was rescheduled one more time from originally May 26–27 in Malibaca Yamato Stadium, Maliana and Baucau Municipal Stadium, Baucau move to May 25–28 in Kampo Demokrasia, Dili. Schedules for Round 8 to Round 14 was also announced at the same time.

Round 1

Round 2

Round 3

Round 4

Round 5

Round 6

Round 7

Round 8

Round 9

Round 10

Round 11

Round 12

Round 13

Round 14

Season statistics

Top scorers

Hat-tricks

 
Notes:
(H) – Home ; (A) – Away
4 – player scorer 4 goals
6 – player scorer 6 goals
7 – player scorer 7 goals

Clean sheets

Own goals

See also
 2018 LFA Segunda
 2018 Taça 12 de Novembro

Notes

References

External links
Official website
Official Facebook page

LFA Primeira seasons
Timor-Leste
2018 in East Timorese sport